Vladimir Ilich Rubin (5 August 1924 – 27 October 2019) was a Soviet and Russian composer. He was born in Moscow, and was a People's Artist of Russia (1995).

Works
 Opera – Three Fat Men

References

Russian composers
Russian male composers
1924 births
2019 deaths
Musicians from Moscow
People's Artists of Russia
Moscow Conservatory alumni
Soviet film score composers
Russian film score composers
Male film score composers
20th-century Russian male musicians